The Judaean Desert or Judean Desert (both Desert of Judah or Judaean Desert) is a desert in the West Bank and Israel that lies east of Jerusalem and descends to the Dead Sea. Under the name El-Bariyah, it has been nominated to the Tentative List of World Heritage Sites in the State of Palestine, particularly for its monastic ruins.

Etymology 
The term  originates in the Hebrew Bible, and it is mentioned in Judges and Psalms.

It is sometimes known as  Yeshimon, meaning desert or wildland, or yet Wilderness of Judah or Wilderness of Judaea, among others.

Geography

The Judaean Desert lies east of Jerusalem and descends to the Dead Sea. The Judaean Desert stretches from the northeastern Negev to the east of Beit El, and is marked by natural terraces with escarpments. It ends in a steep escarpment dropping to the Dead Sea and the Jordan Valley. The Judaean Desert is characterized by the topography of a plateau that ends in the east in a cliff. The Judaean Desert is an area with a special morphological structure along the east of the Judaean Mountains.

A study by the Hebrew University of Jerusalem of an underground water reservoir beneath the Judaean Desert known as the Judaea Group Aquifer, found that the aquifer begins in the Judaean Mountains and flows in a northeasterly direction towards the Dead Sea with outflows at the Tsukim, Kane, Samar and Ein-Gedi springs.

Climate 
The climate ranges from Mediterranean in the west and desert climate in the east, with a strip of steppe climate in the middle.

Flora and fauna 
Rock hyraxes and Nubian Ibex live on the desert plateau and the Dead Sea cliffs. Until quite recently, there were Arabian leopards in the area, but they are now extinct in the area due to illegal hunting. For the last time, an Arabian leopard was spotted in Ein Feshkha.

Common birds in the area include the fan-tailed raven, blackstart, tristram's starling, apus, hirundo, Arabian babbler, wheatear, and sand partridge.

The Judaean Desert is home to a variety of reptiles, including venomous vipers like Echis coloratus and Atractaspis engaddensis (also known as the Israeli mole viper). The streams are home to various fish and amphibians.

History

Biblical references 
According to the Hebrew Bible, David and his men fled into the Judaean Desert to hide from Saul. The Book of Samuel mentions several locations within the Judean Desert that David visited during his escape from Saul, including the Wilderness of Ziph, Wilderness of Ma'on, the Crags of Wild Goats ("Tzuri Ya'alim") and the Wilderness of Ein Gedi. When David hides in the strongholds at Ein Gedi, Saul seeks him "even upon the most craggy rocks, which are accessible only to wild goats". Psalm 63, subtitled a Psalm of David when he was in the wilderness of Judah, has been associated with David's sojourn in the desert of En-gedi.

Hasmonean and Herodian periods 
Several desert fortresses were constructed in the Judaean Desert under Hasmonean and Herodian rule. These forts were constructed atop mountains or in secluded mountain range spurs. Dok, thought to be the oldest, was constructed around 167 BCE. The second fort, Hyrcania, was likely constructed by John Hyrcanus (ruled 134-104 BCE). Alexander Janneus, his son (r. 103 to 76 BCE), is thought to have founded Masada. Herod later established Herodium, which housed a royal complex including one of his palaces and his mausoleum. Cypros, which the Hasmoneans most likely built, was also rebuilt by Herod. Alexandrium and Machaerus, two further desert strongholds, were constructed elsewhere (Samaria and Perea, respectively).

The Essenes, an ascetic Jewish sect, lived in the Judaean Desert on the Dead Sea's northwestern shore, according to Pliny the Elder. Many modern scholars and archaeologists concur that the Essenes resided in Qumran, an archeological site discovered about 1.5 kilometers (1 mi) from the Dead Sea's northwest shore. According to conventional archeology, the Dead Sea Scrolls, which were found in the Qumran Caves, were written by Essenes.

Jewish-Roman Wars 
During the First Jewish-Roman War (67-73 CE) and the Bar Kokhba revolt (132-135 CE), Jewish rebels took advantage of the Judean Desert's natural characteristics for refuge and guerilla warfare. The siege of Masada, which took place there circa 73 CE, was one of the pivotal battles of the conflict. According to Flavius Josephus, early in the conflict, Jewish Sicarii took control of Masada, and from there they launched raids against communities in the Dead Sea region. The Roman Legio X Fretensis rose on Masada in eight camps, and constructed a large siege ramp. Josephus claimed that the siege ended in a mass suicide, when the 960 Sicarii rebels present decided to kill themselves rather than be sold into slavery.

Jewish refugees, primarily army commanders, officials, and their families, escaped to hideout caves during the final stages of the Bar Kokhba revolt, especially after the fall of Betar in 135 CE. Many of these caves were discovered in the Judaean Desert's deep ravines, near intermittent streams. These include the caves in Nahal Michmas, the Almisiya cave, the Murabba'at caves in Nahal Darga, the pool cave in Nahal David, the Cave of Horror and the Cave of Letters (where the letters Simon bar Kokhba wrote to the residents of En Gedi and the Babatha archive were discovered) in Nahal Hever, and three caves in Tze'elim Stream.

Early Christian monasticism
The Judaean Desert is connected with early forms of Christian monasticism. There are examples of Desert Fathers and Desert Mothers and a number of other influential Christian figures, some of which spent much of their lives in the desert as hermits or as members of monastic communities of the lavra or the cenobium type, or on the fringe of the desert in or near settled places such as Bethlehem and Jerusalem, but are still considered to belong to the same monastic environment. A short chronological list can include 
Chariton the Confessor (mid-3rd century – c. 350),  Hilarion the Great (291–371), 
Euthymius the Great (377–473) and his associate Theoctistus of Palestine (died 451 or 467), Jerome (c. 342/47–420) with his associates Paula of Rome (347–404) and her daughter Eustochium (c. 368–419/20) as well as Tyrannius Rufinus (344/45–411), Melania the Elder (ca. 350–417?) and her granddaughter Melania the Younger (c. 383–439), Mary of Egypt (c. 344–421), Gerasimus of the Jordan (5th century), Theodosius the Cenobiarch (c. 423–529) and his contemporary Sabbas the Sanctified (439–532), at whose monastery John of Damascus (c. 675/76–749?) spent much of his life. Cyriacus the Anchorite (448-557) knew Euthymius and Gerasimus and led for many years the Souka of Hilarion. Cyril of Scythopolis (c. 525–559) wrote about the desert monasticism of his time, as did John Moschus (c. 550–619).

Archeology 
The Judaean Desert has been the site of many archeological discoveries. The Dead Sea Scrolls, a collection of ancient Jewish religious manuscripts dating from the 3rd century BCE to the 1st century CE, were discovered in the 1940s at the Qumran Caves. They are considered to be a keystone in the history of archaeology with great historical, religious, and linguistic significance because they include the oldest surviving manuscripts of entire books later included in the biblical canons, along with deuterocanonical and extra-biblical manuscripts which preserve evidence of the diversity of religious thought in late Second Temple Judaism. At the same time they cast new light on the emergence of Christianity and of Rabbinic Judaism.

Numerous Roman period letters and papyri fragments were discovered in the Cave of Letters in Nahal Hever. These include correspondence between Simon bar Kokhba and his subordinates during the Bar Kokhba revolt. Another notable finding is the Babatha cache of papyri, which contains the legal documents of Babatha, a Jewish woman landowner who lived during the 2nd century CE. 

Finds from the Neolithic, including statues, masks, wooden and bone tools, skulls and reed basketry, were found in a cave at Nahal Heimar.

Gallery

See also
 Ein Gedi
 Geography of Israel
 Geography of Palestine
 Mar Saba
 Masada
 Judaean Mountains
 Mount of Temptation
 Qumran Caves
 Tourism in Israel
 Tourism in the Palestinian territories

References

 
Deserts of Israel
Geography of Palestine (region)
Geography of the West Bank
Judea
New Testament regions